is Andymori's second album, released on . The title comes from a line from the first track, "1984."

Promotion

"City Lights" was released on the 7th of January to iTunes, the Recochoku full-download store and the Space Shower music store. A music video for this track was made, directed by Shōji Shinya.

"1984" was released as a radio single in February 2010, reaching #40 on the Billboard Japan Hot 100. A music video for the track was filmed, airing exclusively on Space Shower. It is their first to be filmed with director Kazuyoshi Iijima, and first to not feature input from Shōji Shinya.

Track listing

All songs written by Sohey Oyamada. All songs performed by Andymori.

Japan Sales Rankings

References
 	

Andymori albums
2010 albums